Darren Liddel (born 6 May 1971) was a weightlifting competitor for New Zealand.

At the 1998 Commonwealth Games in Kuala Lumpur he won 3 gold medals in weightlifting, a gold medal in each of the men's 108+ kg clean and jerk, snatch, and combined total. He also competed at the 1994 Commonwealth Games in Victoria where he placed 5th in the men's 108+ kg.

On his return home from the 1998 Commonwealth Games he received a hero's welcome in Te Atatū. At the time he said: "Little did I know three weeks ago that I would be returning home to this kind of welcome. I’m speechless".

After the 1998 Commonwealth Games he was troubled by a worsening wrist injury, and within 2 years he had stopped weightlifting.

References

Living people
1971 births
New Zealand male weightlifters
Commonwealth Games gold medallists for New Zealand
Weightlifters at the 1994 Commonwealth Games
Weightlifters at the 1998 Commonwealth Games
People educated at Rutherford College, Auckland
Commonwealth Games medallists in weightlifting
20th-century New Zealand people
21st-century New Zealand people
Medallists at the 1998 Commonwealth Games